Kalikasan Green Party of the Philippines (Kalikasan Partylist) is a Green party active in the Philippines.

Political parties established in 2010
Liberal parties in the Philippines
Green political parties
2010 establishments in the Philippines